The 1991–92 Hannover 96 season is the 96th season in the football club's history and 29th overall season in the second flight of German football, the 2. Bundesliga, and their third consecutive season having been relegated from the Bundesliga in 1989. Hannover 96 also participated in this season's edition of the domestic cup, the DFB-Pokal, and won the cup for the first time in club history, becoming the first team outside the Bundesliga to do so. This is the 33rd season for Hannover in the Niedersachsenstadion, located in Hanover, Lower Saxony, Germany. The season covers a period from 1 July 1991 to 30 June 1992.

Players

Squad information

Source:

Transfers

In

Out

Competitions

Overview

2. Bundesliga North

League table

Results summary

Results by round

Matches

DFB-Pokal

Final

Statistics

Goalscorers

Clean sheets

References

Hannover 96 seasons
Hannover 96